The Saxon State Ministry of Justice and for Democracy, European Affairs and Gender Equality is the Ministry of Justice of the Government of the Free State of Saxony. The current minister is Katja Meier. Since 2019, the scope includes democracy (citizen's participation and political education), representation of Saxon interests in the European Union, and gender equality, anti-discrimination and protection from violence.

List of ministers of Justice of Saxony 
Since the re-forming of Saxony in 1990, the following have served as state ministers of justice:
Steffen Heitmann (1990–2000)
 (2000–2002)
Thomas de Maizière (2002–2004)
 (2004–2009)
Jürgen Martens (2009–2014)
Sebastian Gemkow (2014–2019)
Katja Meier (2019–present)

References

External links  
Official homepage

Justice ministries
Gender equality ministries
Government of Saxony
Saxony